The Model and the Marriage Broker is a 1951 romantic comedy film about a marriage broker. Though Jeanne Crain (as the model) is top billed, the movie revolves around Thelma Ritter's character (the broker), in a rare leading role for Ritter. Scott Brady also stars. The film is directed by George Cukor and produced by Charles Brackett. At the 24th Academy Awards, it received a nomination in the category of Best Costume Design (Black & White) for Charles LeMaire and Renié. The award, however, went to Edith Head for her work in A Place in the Sun.

Plot
Through her "Contacts and Contracts" company, Mae Swasey is busy scheming to bring couples together. It is not very rewarding financially, and Mae is in debt, as her friend and business associate Doberman reminds her periodically during their regular games of Pinochle. Even one of her seeming successes, Ina Kuschner's impending wedding to Radiographer Matt Hornbeck, does not go as hoped. Ina's mother refuses to pay Mae the agreed-upon $500 commission. Mae, however, gets the last laugh; Matt gets cold feet at the last moment and leaves the bride waiting at the altar.

When Mae goes to see another client, her purse is accidentally taken by model Kitty Bennett, while she gets Kitty's lookalike one. Looking inside for something to identify its owner, Mae reads a letter in which Kitty's current boyfriend apologizes for not mentioning that he is married (but wants to keep on seeing her). When the two women get together to exchange purses, Kitty becomes annoyed when she discovers Mae has read her letter and rejects Mae's advice to give the self-admitted "heel" up.

Kitty comes to apologize for her unkind words later. Mae talks her into breaking up with the married man, then tries to fix her up with Matt by pretending that Kitty may have swallowed a missing earring (which may have fallen into an omelet Mae was preparing) and requires an X-ray.

Matt and Kitty become a couple, but when Kitty learns about Mae's meddling and her plans to maneuver a commitment-averse Matt into proposing, she ends their friendship. Mae, badly shaken, goes away to a resort to think things over.

Before she leaves, Mae gets an unexpected visit from Emmy Swasey. Twenty years before, she had stolen Mae's husband. Now that she is recently widowed and lonely (and not so cute as she used to be), she wants Mae to find her a replacement. Mae turns her down, less because of the past than because she's not sure about her future, having been so rattled by Kitty's denunciation of her business.

When Kitty goes to make up with Mae at her office, she runs into Mr. Johannson, one of Mae's clients, who needs help to patch up his relationship. Kitty reluctantly takes the absent Mae's place. Doberman, hoping to find his friend, tells Kitty how badly she hurt Mae, that Mae thought of her as the daughter she never had, and that Mae helps those who are shy, need a helpful push, and were not gifted with natural beauty and charm. Afterward, Kitty tries to arrange a relationship for Mae with Dan Chancellor, a wealthy Canadian bachelor who had heard of Mae's service. Mae and Kitty become friends again, but Mae, having found out her meeting with Dan wasn't serendipitous after all, comes to realize she herself will never be lonely as long as she has people to help (but she will be, stuck on a peninsula with a man who can't play Pinochle to save his life).

Mae decides that Dan would be a better match for Emmy, since he just wants a good-natured woman who knows how to talk back. Matt and Kitty get past their mutual hesitance, and are clearly headed for the altar.  Back at her office to stay, Kitty and Doberman resume their running Pinochle game, and he surprises Mae by presenting himself as a suitor for her.  She's absorbing all this, as the film ends.

Cast
 Jeanne Crain as Kitty Bennett
 Scott Brady as Matt Hornbeck
 Thelma Ritter as Mae Swasey
 Zero Mostel as George Wixted, one of Mae's more reluctant clients
 Michael O'Shea as Doberman
 Helen Ford as Emmy Swasey
 Frank Fontaine as Hjalmer Johannson
 Dennie Moore as Bea Gingras, who wants her sister Hazel to marry and move out of her home
 John Alexander as Mr. Perry
 Jay C. Flippen as Dan Chancellor
 Nancy Kulp as Hazel Gingras, a new client of Mae's
 Kathryn Card as Mrs. Kuschner
 Maudie Prickett as Delia Seaton
 Ken Christy as Mr. Kuschner
 Shirley Mills as Ina Kuschner

Production
Walter Reisch who worked on the film said it "worked like a million dollars. Fox production head Darryl Zanuck loved the picture so much that I don't think he eliminated one frame. I don't remember one marginal note in a script of 140 pages. We came in on budget, and Cukor's work was lovely, sensitive. We had a big success, and the reason The Model and the Marriage Broker didn't score an even bigger success was because it came just at the start of the age of CinemaScope and color, and that story certainly did not lend itself to CinemaScope and color. It was very intimate... But when it was finished... Zanuck was so involved in CinemaScope and had put so much money and publicity into CinemaScope that he simply treated this picture as a stepchild."

References

External links 
 
 
 

1951 films
1951 romantic comedy films
American romantic comedy films
American black-and-white films
Films directed by George Cukor
Films produced by Charles Brackett
Films scored by Cyril J. Mockridge
Films set in New York City
Films with screenplays by Charles Brackett
20th Century Fox films
1950s English-language films
1950s American films